Dante Raphael Giglio, better known as Giglio Dante, (Sept 4,1914 – Dec 12, 2006) was an Italian-born American painter.

Dante was an active painter for over six decades.  His roots started in Boston, Massachusetts, with a group of other emerging artists later known as the Boston Expressionists. Giglio Dante can be seen pictured alongside his contemporaries in ARTnews, which published a John Brook portrait of eleven Boston painters including Karl Zerbe, Reed Champion, Ture Bengtz, Maud Morgan, Kahlil Gibran (sculptor), Esther Geller, Carl Pickhardt, John Northey, Thomas Fransioli, and Lawrence Kupferman.

Biography 
Giglio Dante came to Boston from Rome in 1921. His father, a respected muralist, trained him in the classical techniques of oil-tempera and fresco. Considered a teenage prodigy, Dante started painting portraits and murals at a young age. In the mid-1930s when working for the W.P.A., he was commissioned to paint two murals, depicting working Italian immigrants, at the Michelangelo School located on Charter Street in Boston. The murals were not without controversy as some residents considered the depiction of Italians as unhappy laborers. Many of his early paintings show the influence of Rouault and Picasso. It was at this time he broke with his father in his portrait work and the traditions of a classical painter and became and an active member in the Boston Expressionists Movement.

The Sgraffito technique with semi-abstract symbolism was widely used by Dante in the 1930s and 40s. He exhibited at the famous Boris Mirski Gallery and taught classes at the Mirski school of Art. He was also part of the dramatic Abstract Expressionist Movement in New York during the mid 1940s and 50s. He contributed to the Provincetown art colony during this period and was one of two founders of Studio Five, a collective artist studio, with sculptor Kenneth Campbell.

Dante showed his work in Boston and New York City during the 1940s and moved permanently to New York in the 1950s. He became part of the Betty Parson Gallery for 10 years and sold with the likes of Mark Rothko, Hans Hofmann, and Barnett Newman. He was one of the first artists to move into the Westbeth Artists Community in 1970 where he exhibited in their major shows. It was during this period he started with the abstract sculpture technique of Assemblage.

He started dividing his time during the mid 1970s between Westbeth NYC and East Hampton, NY.  He finally moved permanently to East Hampton in 1981.

Dante continued painting and in 1986 he won Best in Show at Guild Hall's Annual Artist Members Exhibition for his mixed media work  of  “Portrait of Contessa V.”

Giglio Dante died at age 92 on December 12, 2006.  He is buried along with his wife in the Green River Cemetery of Long Island NY.

Solo exhibitions
 1945 Mortimer Brandt Gallery, New York, New York
 1946, 1948, 1953 Betty Parsons Gallery, New York, New York
 1944, 1946, 1947 Boris Mirski Gallery, Boston, Massachusetts
 1949 Fitchburg Art Museum, Fitchburg, Massachusetts
 1958 Salpeter Gallery, New York, New York
 1948,1950, 1956, 1960 Feingarten Art Gallery, Chicago, Illinois 
 Rutgers University, New Brunswick, New Jersey
 1963 Krasner Gallery, New York, New York 
 1960, 1963 Lucy Bayne Gallery, Los Angeles, California
 1968 Albright College, Reading, Pennsylvania
 1971, 1972 Westbeth Gallery, New York, New York
 1981, 1982 Elaine Benson Gallery, Bridgehampton, New York
 1986 Bologna/Landi Gallery, East Hampton, New York
 1987 Guild Hall, East Hampton, New York
 1987–91, Benton Gallery, Southampton, New York

Collections and Exhibitions (1945–2000) 
 Museum of Modern Art, Rome, Italy
 The Institute of Modern Art, Boston Massachusetts
 Springfield Museum of Fine Arts, Springfield, Massachusetts
 Betty Parsons Collection
 Thomas B. Hess Collection
 Brandeis University
 Nathaniel Saltonstall Collection
 Albright College Fine Arts Collection
 Guild Hall Museum, East Hampton, New York
 Golden Gate International Exposition, San Francisco, California
 Boston Museum of Fine Arts, Massachusetts
 Pennsylvania Academy, Philadelphia, Pennsylvania
 Museum of Modern Art, Rome Italy
 Whitney Museum of American Art, New York, New York
 Cincinnati Art Museum, Ohio
 Worcester Art Museum
 Arles Museum, France
 Corcoran Gallery of Art, Washington, DC
 Metz Museum, France
 Toulouse Museum des Beaux Arts, France
 Elaine Benson Gallery, Bridgehampton, New York
 Bologna/Landi Gallery, Bridgehampton, New York
 Benton Gallery, Southampton, New York
 Arlene Bujese Gallery, East Hampton, New York
 Wainscott Gallery, Wainscott, New York
 Nabi Gallery, Sag Harbor, New York

References 

1914 births
2006 deaths
20th-century Italian painters
Italian emigrants to the United States
21st-century Italian painters